Amphibolips quercuspomiformis, also known as the apple gall wasp or live oak apple gall wasp, is a species of gall wasp. It induces galls in coast live oak and interior live oak trees. Like many gall wasps, it has two alternating generations: a parthenogenic generation, and a bisexual generation. The galls formed by the all-female parthenogenic generation are spherical, up to 40 mm in diameter, and covered with short spines. They form on stems and are green or red when new, then turn brown. The galls formed by the bisexual generation are small, shaped like toadstools, and occur on leaves.

References

External links 
 Amphibolips quercuspomiformis on gallformers
 Amphibolips quercuspomiformis on BugGuide

Cynipidae
Gall-inducing insects
Oak galls